The James Merrill House is a 19th-century house at 107 Water Street in Stonington Borough in southeastern Connecticut, formerly owned by poet James Merrill. Upon his death in 1995, the house was kept by the village as a home for writers and scholars.

History

The American poet James Merrill and his partner David Jackson moved to the borough of Stonington, Connecticut, in 1954, purchasing a property at 107 Water Street. It had once been a nineteenth-century residential and commercial structure that had first served as a drug store and a residence for the owner's family. Merrill spent summers in Stonington borough until his death in 1995. Village life and the apartment itself inspired some of his most important work, including The Changing Light at Sandover, his book-length epic poem based on Merrill's and Jackson's communications with the spirit world by means of a Ouija board in the turret dining room on the third floor.

After James Merrill's death in 1995, the Stonington Village Improvement Association (SVIA) transformed the Jackson and Merrill apartments into a place for writers to live and work. A group of Stonington residents and friends of Merrill began a program that would make the apartment available, rent-free, to writers and scholars for academic-year residencies. The Merrill apartment looks much the way Merrill left it – the personally eclectic décor remains as it was two decades ago. In the years since Merrill's death, over thirty writers have used this space as a residence and retreat.

The house is usually occupied by just one writer at a time, for stays of one month in fall and winter or three months during spring.

The house was added to the National Register of Historic Places on August 28, 2013 and designated a National Historic Landmark on October 31, 2016.

James Merrill House Writers in Residence 

Eryn Green
Peter Kline and Brittany Perham (December 2013 – January 2014)
Mieke Eerkens (November 2013)
Amy Beeder (October 2013)
Caitlin Doyle (September 2013)
Dan O'Brien (June 2013)
James Reidel (2013 Spring)
Sally Ball (December 2012)
Gimbiya Kettering (November 2012)
Amy Greacen (October 2012)
Lydia Conklin (September 2012)
Peter Filkins (2012 Spring)
Will Schutt (2011 Fall)
Jedediah Berry (2011 Spring)
Josh Weil (2010 Fall)
Bruce Snider (2010 Spring)
Cate Marvin (2009 Fall)
Ivy Pochoda (2009 Spring)
Piotr Gwiazda (2008 Fall)
Langdon Hammer (2008 Spring)
Nancy Reisman (2007 Fall)
Rick Hilles (2007 Fall)
Anna Potter / Jacob Gamage (2007 Spring)
Michael Snediker (2006 Fall)
Jason Zuzga (2005–2006)
J.S. Marcus (2004–2005)
Matthew Zapruder (2003 Spring)
Paul Merrill (2002 Fall)
Sarah Gorham (2002 Spring)
Jeffrey Skinner (2002 Spring)
Molly McQuade (2001 Fall)
Brigit Pegeen Kelly (2000–2001)
Michael Madonick (2000–2001)
Aidan Wasley (1999–2000)
Ted Deppe (1998–1999)
Annie Deppe (1998–1999)
Daniel Hall (1997–1998)
Scott Westrem (1996–1997)
Peter Hawkins (1995–1996)

Gallery

See also
National Register of Historic Places listings in New London County, Connecticut
List of National Historic Landmarks in Connecticut

References

External links 

Official site

Literary museums in the United States
Historic house museums in Connecticut
Houses on the National Register of Historic Places in Connecticut
National Register of Historic Places in New London County, Connecticut
LGBT places in the United States
Houses in New London County, Connecticut
National Historic Landmarks in Connecticut